René Mercier (born 22 January 1937) is a French biathlete. He competed in the 20 km individual event at the 1960 Winter Olympics.

References

1937 births
Living people
French male biathletes
Olympic biathletes of France
Biathletes at the 1960 Winter Olympics
Sportspeople from Savoie